4-Anisaldehyde, or p-Anisaldehyde, is an organic compound with the formula CH3OC6H4CHO.  The molecule consists of a benzene ring with an formyl and a methoxy group.  It is a colorless liquid with a strong aroma. It provides sweet, floral and strong aniseed odor.  Two isomers of 4-anisaldehyde are known, ortho-anisaldehyde and meta-anisaldehyde.  They are less commonly encountered.

Production 
Anisaldehyde is prepared commercially by oxidation of 4-methoxytoluene (p-cresyl methyl ether) using manganese dioxide to convert a methyl group to the aldehyde group.  It can also be produced by oxidation of anethole, a related fragrance that is found in some alcoholic beverages, by oxidative cleavage of an alkene.

Uses 
Being structurally related to vanillin, 4-anisaldehyde is a widely used in the fragrance and flavor industry.  It is used as an intermediate in the synthesis of other compounds important in pharmaceuticals and perfumery. The related ortho isomer has a scent of licorice.

A solution of para-anisaldehyde in acid and ethanol is a useful stain in thin layer chromatography. Different chemical compounds on the plate can give different colors, allowing easy distinction.

DNA breakage

Anisaldehyde in combination with copper (II) can induce single- and double-strand breaks in double stranded DNA.

References 

Flavors
Benzaldehydes